Alexander Nicolaas "Skip" Wolters (23 November 1929 – 12 December 2003) was a Singaporean water polo player. He competed in the men's tournament at the 1956 Summer Olympics.

References

External links
 

1929 births
2003 deaths
Singaporean male water polo players
Olympic water polo players of Singapore
Water polo players at the 1956 Summer Olympics
Place of birth missing
20th-century Singaporean people